Musical Moments from Chopin (also known as Chopin's Musical Moments) is a 1946 produced Musical Miniature cartoon, co-starring Andy Panda and Woody Woodpecker. It was directed by Dick Lundy and was released on February 24, 1947. It was nominated for an Academy Award for best short subject in 1946, losing to MGM's Tom and Jerry cartoon, The Cat Concerto.

Film
This short starts with Andy Panda performing a Chopin polonaise on stage. As he does so, Woody Woodpecker wanders out and starts polishing the piano, and seems impressed by Andy's playing. Woody then plays along with Andy on the following pieces, either on the same or another grand piano, with increasing cut-aways to the animal audience and their own antics. At some point, a horse who was trying to light his cigar tried to use a ceiling lamp to light it, but accidentally causes it to fall and spread a fire onto the stage. Andy manages to finish his piano performance while Woody extinguishes the flames.

Analysis 
The short would be the first Musical Miniature cartoon produced by Walter Lantz Productions, and is one of two cartoons in the series to be nominated for an Academy Award for best short subject (the other Woody Woodpecker's cartoon to receive this honor was the 1943's The Dizzy Acrobat). This was Lundy's eight Academy Award nomination.

Lundy previously tested the concept in the 1946 Andy Panda cartoon, The Poet & Peasant. It was proven to be a success as it was also nominated for an Academy Award. Lundy would direct all of the remaining Musical Miniature cartoons until the studios brief closure.

The short features music by Frédéric Chopin played by Woody and Andy, which includes:
 Polonaise in A major, Op. 40, No. 1
 Polonaise in A-flat major, Op. 53
 Fantaisie-Impromptu in C-sharp minor, Op. 66
 Ecossaise in D major, Op.72/3
 Mazurka in B-flat major, Op. 7/1
 Scherzo No. 2 in B-flat minor, Op. 31
In 1958, the television show The Woody Woodpecker Show premiered, and continued on the air in various forms for the next four decades. Episode 18 of its first season included Musical Moments from Chopin along with other Lantz cartoons, and a making-of involving Walter Lantz and storyboarding.

References

External links
 

1946 animated films
Films about music and musicians
Animated films without speech
Films directed by Dick Lundy
Walter Lantz Productions shorts
1940s American animated films
Andy Panda films
Woody Woodpecker films
Universal Pictures animated short films
Animated films about animals
Films about bears
Animated films about birds
1946 films
Cultural depictions of Frédéric Chopin